

Belgium

Acar is a rare Belgian last name. The origins of Acar come from the French last name Acart. Here, the 't' is not pronounced in spoken French, and hence was dropped in writing.

Notable people with the last name include:

  (1937-1976), Belgian journalist, comic book writer, notably worked on short stories for TinTin and Strapontin with René Goscinny.

France

Acar is a rare noble French patronymic name from Bar-Sur-Aube dating back to the 15th Century, where it is found at different times in various localities, especially in Champagne and Burgundy.

Acar is also a rare Medieval French byname from Picardy. The name is a variant of Achard, Achart and Acquart.

Furthermore, Acar may be an altered form of French (Pas-de-Calais, Nord) Ancart, itself a variant of Hancart and Hanecart: from a pet form (double diminutive) of the personal name Han, a short form of French Jehan and Flemish Johan(nes) (see John).

Notable people with this surname include:

Jean-Rémy Acar, Director General of La Fédération des particuliers employeurs de France (FEPEM)

Lebanon

Acar (Aramaic: ܥܟܪ; Western Syriac-Aramaic: ܥܳܟܶܪ; Hebrew: עכר) is a Lebanese last name of Aramaic origin. 

In Lebanon, the last name Acar developed as a nickname given to someone who stirs up trouble. Properly, the name means to roil water; and figuratively, it means to disturb or to afflict.

The nickname was a type of nom-de-guerre given to some rural Maronite militiamen in the Qartaba, Deir el Qamar, and Zahlé areas during the Lebanese Peasants Revolt and 1860 civil conflict in Mount Lebanon and Damascus led by Tanyus Shahin.

Although a nickname registered in the recent history of Lebanon, the history of Acar dates back to the Bible's Old Testament, and is Anglicized as Achar and Achan (biblical figure). In the Bible, this is the name of an Israelite who stole forbidden items during the assault on Jericho, for which he and his family were stoned to death (Book of Genesis 36:27, and in Books of Chronicles 1:42 he is called Jaakan).

The word Acar may be the origin of the Greek word 'achos' ("woe" or "pain"). Therefore, the Greek name Achaeus, and the name of the Ancient Greek mythological hero Achilles may find an origin in the Aramaic Acar.

Notable people of Lebanese origin with the last name include:

Jacques F. Acar (1931-2020), French doctor and microbiologist who specialized in antibiotics.
Joseph Acar (1898-?), first Lebanese aviator.
Antoine Abi-Acar (?-2019), Priest, owner and founder of a publishing house in Paris named "CARISCRIPT".
 Edward J. Akar, Sierra Leonean Deputy Finance Minister, economist, and lawyer.
 John Akar (1927–1975), Sierra Leonean entertainer, writer, and diplomat.

Turkey

In Turkey, Acar is pronounced as “adjar”, a last name meaning “bold”.

Notable Turkish people with the last name include:

Denho Acar (born 1974), Turkish mobster
İsmail Acar (born 1971), Turkish painter
Kuzgun Acar (1928-1976), Turkish Sculptor
Numan Acar (born 1974), Turkish-German actor and film producer
Onur Acar (born 1983), Turkish footballer
Serkan Acar (1948–2013), Turkish football player
Sevdiye Nilgün Acar (born 1958), Turkish artist
Timur Acar (born 1979), Turkish actor
Tolgahan Acar (born 1986), Turkish footballer
Veli Acar (born 1981), Turkish footballer

References

Turkish-language surnames